A random wire antenna is a radio antenna consisting of a long wire suspended above the ground, whose length does not bear a particular relation to the wavelength of the radio waves used, but is typically chosen more for convenience. The wire may be straight or it may be strung back and forth between trees or walls just to get enough wire into the air. Due to the great variability of the (unplanned) antenna structure, effectiveness can vary wildly from one installation to another.  Random wire antennas are typically fed at one end against a suitable counterpoise (such as earth ground).

They are widely used as receiving antennas on the long wave, medium wave, and short wave bands, as well as transmitting antennas on these bands for small outdoor, temporary or emergency transmitting stations, as well as in situations where more permanent antennas cannot be installed.

Random wire and long wire 
Often random wire antennas are also (inaccurately) referred to as long-wire antenna. Actual long-wire antennas require a length greater than a quarter-wavelength (λ/4) or half (λ/2) of the radio waves (most consider a true long wire to be least one wavelength), whereas random wire antennas have no such constraint.

When the length of the wire is near an even multiple of quarter-wavelengths, its feedpoint impedance may take on extreme values (thousands of ohms) due to resonance, which can cause low efficiency with popular impedance matching schemes. The radiation efficiency of the wire is not affected; if the antenna is worked against a resistive counterpoise (such as a poor ground) and a suitable matching scheme is used, the efficiency of the antenna system may actually increase significantly.

Radiation pattern
The radiation pattern of a thin wire antenna is easily predictable using antenna modeling. For a straight wire, the radiation pattern can be described by axially symmetric multipole moments with no component along the wire direction; as the length of the wire is increased, higher multipole contributions become more prominent and multiple lobes (maxima) at angles to the antenna axis develop.    Under about 0.6λ a wire antenna will have a single lobe with a maximum at right angles to the axis.  Above this the lobe will split into two conical lobes with their maximum directed at equal angles to the wire, and a null between them.  This results in four azimuth angles at which the gain is maximum.  As the length of wire in wavelengths increases, the number of lobes increases and the maxima become increasingly sharp.

Any unpredictability of the radiation pattern is caused by uncontrolled interaction with nearby matter (such as soil or structures). For example, a long wire antenna close to the ground will form a leaky two-conductor transmission line and therefore also act somewhat as a traveling wave antenna, with reception off the end of the wire (the system is no longer axially symmetric).   A folded or zig-zag antenna may exhibit a more complex pattern as there are even fewer symmetry constraints on the dipole moments that may contribute.

Long wire antennas are reported to be more effective for reception than multielement antennas such as Yagi or quad antennas with the same length of wire.

Construction

A random wire antenna usually consists of a long (at least one quarter wavelength) wire with one end connected to the radio and the other in free space, arranged in any way most convenient for the space available.   Ideally, it is a straight wire strung as high as possible between trees or buildings, the ends insulated from supports with strain insulators. Typically it is made from number 12 or 14 AWG ( diameter) copperclad wire.   Folding the wire into a zigzag pattern to fit in a limited space such as an apartment or attic will reduce effectiveness and make theoretical analysis extremely difficult. (The added length helps more than the folding typically hurts.)

If used for transmitting, a random wire antenna usually will also require an antenna tuner, as it has an unpredictable impedance that varies with frequency. One side of the output of the tuner is connected directly to the antenna, without a transmission line, the other to a good earth ground.  A quarter-wavelength sized wire works best, and unless fed through an unun, a half-wavelength will exceed the matching ability of most tuners. Even without a good earth, the antenna will also radiate, but it will do so by coupling capacitively to any nearby conducting material; this is not recommended. The ground for a random wire antenna may be chosen by experimentation. Grounds could be returned to a nearby cold water pipe or a wire approximately one-quarter wavelength long, or can be replaced by randomly laid-out quarter-wavelength counterpoise wires attached to the ground connection.

References 

Radio frequency antenna types